This is an alphabetical list of short story writers from Scotland.

 William Black
 John Burke
 John Burnside
 Arthur Conan Doyle
 A. J. Cronin
 Carol Anne Davis
 Bill Drummond
 Alastair Dunnett
 Ian Hamilton Finlay
 Matthew Fitt
 Alasdair Gray
 Neil Gunn
 Tom Hanlin
 Laura Hird
 James Hogg
 Jules Horne
 James Kelman
 A. L. Kennedy
 Eric Linklater
 George MacDonald
 Bernard MacLaverty
 Alistair MacLean
 Brian McCabe
 Alexander McCall Smith
 Sharon McPherson
 Candia McWilliam
 Metaphrog
 Neil Munro
 Agnes Owens
 Neil Paterson
 Dilys Rose
 Brian Ruckley
 Ali Smith
 Iain Crichton Smith
 Muriel Spark
 Robert Louis Stevenson
 Annie Shepherd Swan
 Ruth Thomas
 Violet Tweedale
 Fred Urquhart
 Irvine Welsh

See also

 Scottish literature
 List of Scottish writers

Short story writers